Cottontail may refer to:

Biology
 Cottontail rabbit
 Dice's cottontail, Sylvilagus dicei
 Omilteme cottontail, Sylvilagus insonus
 Desert cottontail, Sylvilagus audubonii
 Manzano mountain cottontail, Sylvilagus cognatus
 Mexican cottontail, Sylvilagus cunicularis
 Eastern cottontail, Sylvilagus floridanus
 Mountain cottontail, Sylvilagus nuttallii
 Appalachian cottontail or rarely Allegheny cottontail, Sylvilagus obscurus 
 New England cottontail, Sylvilagus transitionalis

Other uses
 Cottontail (film), a 2022 film
 Peter Cottontail, a character in the works of Thornton W. Burgess
 "Cotton Tail", a 1940 composition by Duke Ellington 
 Cotton-tail, a character in Beatrix Potter's Peter Rabbit stories